Osmar Aparecido de Azevedo or simply Osmar (born March 27, 1980 in Marília), is a Brazilian striker. He is also known in his native Brazil by the nickname Cambalhota ("Backflip").

Club statistics

Honours

Santo André
Brazilian Cup: 2004

Grêmio
Brazilian Série B: 2005

Palmeiras
Campeonato Paulista: 2008

External links

 sambafoot
 Guardian Stats Centre
 zerozero.pt
 palmeiras.globo.com
 CBF
 globoesporte
 sopalmeiras

1980 births
Living people
People from Marília
Brazilian footballers
Brazilian expatriate footballers
Expatriate footballers in Japan
Expatriate footballers in Mexico
Campeonato Brasileiro Série A players
J1 League players
Liga MX players
Rio Branco Esporte Clube players
União São João Esporte Clube players
Esporte Clube Santo André players
Sociedade Esportiva Palmeiras players
Grêmio Foot-Ball Porto Alegrense players
Atlético Morelia players
Oita Trinita players
Fortaleza Esporte Clube players
Esporte Clube Vitória players
Guaratinguetá Futebol players
Association football forwards
Footballers from São Paulo (state)